Justice Takes a Holiday is a 1933 American crime film directed by Spencer Gordon Bennet and written by John T. Neville. The film stars H. B. Warner, Patricia O'Brien, John Ince, Matty Kemp, Huntley Gordon, Audrey Ferris and Robert Frazer. The film was released on April 18, 1933, by Mayfair Pictures.

Cast          
H. B. Warner as John Logan
Patricia O'Brien as Margaret Logan
John Ince as Warden
Matty Kemp as Larry Harrison
Huntley Gordon as Judge Martin Walker
Audrey Ferris as Margaret Walker
Robert Frazer as David Harrison
Syd Saylor as 'Scoop' Jones

References

Bibliography
 Katchmer, George A. Eighty Silent Film Stars: Biographies and Filmographies of the Obscure to the Well Known. McFarland, 1991.
 Pitts, Michael R. Poverty Row Studios, 1929–1940: An Illustrated History of 55 Independent Film Companies, with a Filmography for Each. McFarland & Company, 2005.

External links
 

1933 films
1930s English-language films
American crime films
1933 crime films
Films directed by Spencer Gordon Bennet
American black-and-white films
Mayfair Pictures films
1930s American films